George Armstrong (29 December 1882 – 12 January 1956) was an Australian cricketer. He played in two first-class matches for Queensland between 1909 and 1911.

See also
 List of Queensland first-class cricketers

References

External links
 

1882 births
1956 deaths
Australian cricketers
Queensland cricketers
Cricketers from Brisbane